The Wadi Dib ring complex in the Eastern Desert of Egypt is a circular geological structure visible from space. It is the result of an upwelling of magma that solidified into a series of different rock types, each rock type containing a distinct color.

References

External links 
Satellite photo by Planet Labs

See also 
El-Ramly MF, Hussein AAA (1985) The ring complexes of the Eastern Desert of Egypt. J Afr Earth Sci 3: 77–82
Frisch, W (1982) The Wadi Dib ring complex, Nubian Desert (Egypt) and its importance for the upper limit of the Pan-African Orogeny. Precambrian Research. vol. 16: A20.

Geology of Egypt
Sahara
Volcanism of Africa